After Shave is a 2005 Lebanese short film by the Lebanese director Hany Tamba. It won the 2006 César Awards for best short film.

Synopsis
Abou Milad is an old barber who lost his hairdressing salon during the Lebanese civil war. Nowadays, he earns his crust by cutting hair in the working class cafés of Beirut. One day, he is summoned by a recluse who lives in a grand bourgeois house.

Music
The film was scored by Lebanese composer Khaled Mouzanar.

Cast
Rafic Ali Ahmad as Raymond Baddar
Mahmoud Mabsout as Abou Milad
Julia Kassar as Samira Baddar
Fady Reaidy as Jamil

References

External links

2005 films
2000s Arabic-language films
2005 comedy-drama films
Lebanese comedy-drama films